Andria Lawrence (born Maureen Smith, 20 June 1936) is an English actress, best known for her roles  in On the Buses, and in Coronation Street as Janet Stockwell.

Career
Andria Lawrence is best remembered for her appearances in both the TV and film productions of the 1970s’ British sitcom On the Buses. Her performance as "Turnaround Betty" in the 1971 On the Buses film exemplified the amorous type of comic role in which she was most often cast. She was cast to similar comic type in For the Love of Ada (1972) and Man About the House (1974).

She is also remembered for her part as a pretty barmaid in a c.1970 TV advert for Courage Tavern Keg Bitter, in which her line was "Ooooh, it's too strong for me .... but I like the men who drink it!"

Lawrence demonstrated skill in drama too. She appeared in Ken Loach's acclaimed slice of gritty realism Cathy Come Home (1966) and in the Hammer Films production Countess Dracula (1971).

Lawrence is also a writer, publishing novel The Olive Tree in 2016.

Filmography

TV credits

References

External links
 
 Andria Lawrence on the British Film Institute website
 Andria Lawrence on The Actors' Compendium
 On the Buses website
 In The Plain Man's Guide to Advertising (1962), at 09.20; 11.10
 In On the Buses (1971), 'Canteen Trouble'
 In For the Love of Ada (1972), from 01.33
 Official website

1941 births
English film actresses
English television actresses
20th-century English actresses
Actresses from London
Living people